Otaram Dewasi (born 10 October 1964) is member of Rajasthan Legislative Assembly. He was elected to the assembly from Sirohi in 2008 and again in 2013 as a candidate of Bharatiya Janata Party.  He has served as the chairman of Rajasthan Livestock Board and has served as the first cow minister of India.

Otaram Dewasi is a resident of Mundara village which lies under Bali assembly constituency. The devotee of Mother Chamunda, Otaram Dewasi was a cop in Rajasthan Police. Later, he left the job due to health issues. He believes by the grace of Mother Chamunda his health got back to normal & thus he became the supreme devotee of Mother Chamunda and serve as “Mahant” at Mundara Mata Temple.

Otaram Dewasi belongs to Dewasi society associated with animal husbandry and a great leader of them in western Rajasthan.

Mr. Om Prakash Mathur, a senior BJP leader, presented him with Shri Bhairon Singh Shekhawat a former Chief Minister of Rajasthan. Then, Otaram Dewasi had helped in getting the votes of Dewasi society to Shri Bhairon Singh Shekhawat, a BJP candidate from the Bali, (Pali, Rajasthan) assembly. After this, in the Government of Atal Bihari Vajpayee, Otaram Dewasi was appointed as Chairman of the National Seeds Corporation Limited, Delhi, giving status of Union Minister of State.

Then after he met with Vasundhara Raje. In the previous Government she made him the State Minister & offered the Chairman position of the Animal Husbandry Welfare Board. In the last assembly elections, He was the candidate from Sirohi assembly constituency and Live up to expectations of Vasundhara Raje by winning those election & again gave victory to BJP by 25,000 votes in 2014-15 elections. And he served as Minister- Gaupalan Department, Government of Rajasthan in Vasundhara Raje led BJP Government from 2013 to 2018.

References

1964 births
Living people
Rajasthani politicians
People from Sirohi district
Members of the Rajasthan Legislative Assembly
Bharatiya Janata Party politicians from Rajasthan